The Băița is a right tributary of the river Lăpuș in Romania. It discharges into the Lăpuș in Bușag.

References

Rivers of Romania
Rivers of Maramureș County